Crescent rolls may refer to

Croissant, a crescent-shaped puff pastry
Pillsbury Crescents, a type of premade puff pastry dough made by The Pillsbury Company invented in the United States in the 1960s
The material that comprises Poppin' Fresh, the Pillsbury Doughboy
Crescent roll dough, a yeasty dough similar to puff pastry and pie crust

See also

Crescent (disambiguation)
Roll (disambiguation)